Ascalenia thoracista is a moth in the family Cosmopterigidae. It was described by Edward Meyrick in 1915. It is found in Sri Lanka.

References

Moths described in 1915
Ascalenia
Moths of Asia